Gemmells is a locality in the Adelaide Hills of South Australia. It lies between Mount Barker and Strathalbyn, both by road and on the Victor Harbor railway line.

Gemmells was named for Thomas Gemmell, an early farmer and pastoralist in the area.

References

Adelaide Hills